Harmony Grove Meeting House, also known as Harmony Grove Church, is a historic church off I-79 in Harmony Grove, Monongalia County, West Virginia. It was built in 1854, and is a small, one-story wood-frame building.  It measures 20 feet wide and 50 feet long.  It sits on a foundation of rough-cut stone blocks.  It is the oldest unaltered church building in Monongalia County.

The church was built by Presbyterians, Baptists and Methodists.  The deed for the land apportioned one Sunday per month to each denomination, leaving the fourth and fifth Sundays for "any Protestant Minister of good standing in his own church".  The founding documents specifically prohibited Roman Catholics, which was not unusual for that era.  Several denominations used the church until 1910, when Methodist circuit preachers became the main users. The church was also used as a school during the week, primarily from 1864 through 1871. The church was closed in 1979.

It was listed on the National Register of Historic Places in 1983.

References

Churches on the National Register of Historic Places in West Virginia
Churches completed in 1854
Churches in West Virginia
Buildings and structures in Monongalia County, West Virginia
National Register of Historic Places in Monongalia County, West Virginia
1854 establishments in Virginia